Mups may refer to:

 Major urinary proteins
 Medically unexplained physical symptoms